The 21st César Awards ceremony, presented by the Académie des Arts et Techniques du Cinéma, honoured the best French films of 1995 and took place on 3 February 1996 at the Théâtre des Champs-Élysées in Paris. The ceremony was chaired by Philippe Noiret and hosted by Antoine de Caunes. La Haine won the award for Best Film.

Winners and nominees

See also
 68th Academy Awards
 49th British Academy Film Awards
 8th European Film Awards
 1st Lumières Awards

External links

 Official website
 
 21st César Awards at AlloCiné

1996
1996 film awards
Ces